The Chicago Film Critics Association Award for Best Supporting Actress is an annual award given by the Chicago Film Critics Association.

Winners

1980s

1990s

2000s

2010s

2020s

References
 http://www.chicagofilmcritics.org/index.php?option=com_content&view=article&id=49&Itemid=59
 https://web.archive.org/web/20120515203059/http://www.chicagofilmcritics.org/index.php?option=com_content&view=article&id=48&Itemid=58
 https://web.archive.org/web/20100224070822/http://www.chicagofilmcritics.org/index.php?option=com_content&view=article&id=62&Itemid=60

Supporting Actress
Film awards for supporting actress